Aberdeen F.C. competed in the Scottish Football League and Scottish Cup in season 1920–21.

Overview

Aberdeen finished in 11th place out of 22 clubs in the Scottish Football League, an improvement on the previous season's finish of 17th. In the cup, they lost out to local rivals Dundee after a second replay in the third round. Peter Fisher finished as the club's top scorer with 14 goals.

Results

Scottish Football League

Final standings

Scottish Cup

Squad

Appearances & Goals

|}

References

Aberdeen F.C. seasons
Aberdeen